The Chinese Standard Bible (CSB 中文标准译本 ), is a Chinese New Testament translation produced by the Global Bible Initiative and Holman Bible Publishers in 2009.

Printed editions
Mandarin CSB/CUV Parallel New Testament 2009 1433600129

See also
Chinese Bible Translations

References

External links
 CSB website

Standard Bible
2009 non-fiction books
2009 in Christianity